Lagash (cuneiform:  LAGAŠKI; Sumerian: Lagaš), was an ancient city state located northwest of the junction of the Euphrates and Tigris rivers and east of Uruk, about  east of the modern town of Al-Shatrah, Iraq. Lagash (modern Al-Hiba) was one of the oldest cities of the Ancient Near East. Lagash's main temple was the E-ninnu at Girsu, dedicated to the god Ningirsu. Lagash seems to have incorporated the ancient cities of Girsu, Nina, Uruazagga and Erim.

History 
From inscriptions found at Girsu such as the Gudea cylinders, it appears that Lagash was an important Sumerian city in the late 3rd millennium BC. It was at that time ruled by independent kings, Ur-Nanshe (24th century BC) and his successors, who were engaged in contests with the Elamites to the east and the kings of Kienĝir and Kish to the north. Some of the earlier works from before the Akkadian conquest are also extremely interesting, in particular Eanatum's Stele of the Vultures and Entemena's great silver vase ornamented with Ningirsu's sacred animal Anzû: a lion-headed eagle with wings outspread, grasping a lion in each talon. With the Akkadian conquest Lagash lost its independence, its ruler or ensi becoming a vassal of Sargon of Akkad and his successors; but Lagash continued to be a city of much importance and, above all, a centre of artistic development. Early scholars suggested that Lagash was a temple theocracy which had absolute control, but Samuel Noah Kramer argued that further discoveries of documents have shown this to be an error.

After the collapse of Sargon's state, Lagash again thrived under its independent kings (ensis), Ur-Baba and Gudea, and had extensive commercial communications with distant realms. According to his own records, Gudea brought cedars from the Amanus and Lebanon mountains in Syria, diorite from eastern Arabia, copper and gold from central and southern Arabia, while his armies were engaged in battles with Elam on the east. His was especially the era of artistic development. We even have a fairly good idea of what Gudea looked like, since he placed in temples throughout his city numerous statues or idols depicting himself with lifelike realism (Statues of Gudea). At the time of Gudea, the capital of Lagash was actually in Girsu. It contained 17 larger cities, eight district capitals, and numerous villages (about 40 known by name). According to one estimate, Lagash was the largest city in the world from c. 2075 to 2030 BC.

Soon after the time of Gudea, Lagash was absorbed into the Ur III state as one of its prime provinces. There is some information about the area during the Old Babylonian period. After that it seems to have lost its importance; at least we know nothing more about it until the construction of the Seleucid fortress mentioned, when it seems to have become part of the Iranian kingdom of Characene.

First dynasty of Lagash (c. 2500–2300 BC)

The dynasties of Lagash are not found on the Sumerian King List, although one extremely fragmentary supplement has been found in Sumerian, known as The Rulers of Lagash. It recounts how after the flood mankind was having difficulty growing food for itself, being dependent solely on rainwater; it further relates that techniques of irrigation and cultivation of barley were then imparted by the gods. At the end of the text is the statement "Written in the school", suggesting this was a scribal school production. A few of the names from the Lagash rulers listed below may be made out, including Ur-Nanshe, "Ane-tum", En-entar-zid, Ur-Ningirsu, Ur-Bau, and Gudea.

The First dynasty of Lagash is dated to the 26th century BC. En-hegal was possibly an ancient ruler of the Sumerian city-state of Lagash. The tablet with his name describes a business transaction, in which a possible King En-hegal buys land. If indeed a king of Lagash, it is estimated he would have ruled circa 2570 BCE. Both his status and date are disputed.

Lugalshaengur was tributary to Mesilim. Following the hegemony of Mesannepada of Ur, Ur-Nanshe succeeded Lugal-sha-engur as the new high priest of Lagash and achieved independence, making himself king. He defeated Ur and captured the king of Umma, Pabilgagaltuku. In the ruins of a building attached by him to the temple of Ningirsu, terracotta bas reliefs of the king and his sons have been found, as well as onyx plates and lions' heads in onyx reminiscent of Egyptian work. One inscription states that ships of Dilmun (Bahrain) brought him wood as tribute from foreign lands. He was succeeded by his son Akurgal.

Eannatum, grandson of Ur-Nanshe, made himself master of the whole of the district of Sumer, together with the cities of Uruk (ruled by Enshakushana), Ur, Nippur, Akshak, and Larsa. He also annexed the kingdom of Kish; however, it recovered its independence after his death. Umma was made tributary—a certain amount of grain being levied upon each person in it, that had to be paid into the treasury of the goddess Nina and the god Ningirsu. Eannatum's campaigns extended beyond the confines of Sumer, and he overran a part of Elam, took the city of Uru'az on the Persian Gulf, and exacted tribute as far as Mari; however, many of the realms he conquered were often in revolt. During his reign, temples and palaces were repaired or erected at Lagash and elsewhere; the town of Nina—that probably gave its name to the later Niniveh—was rebuilt, and canals and reservoirs were excavated. Eannatum was succeeded by his brother, En-anna-tum I. During his rule, Umma once more asserted independence under Ur-Lumma, who attacked Lagash unsuccessfully. Ur-Lumma was replaced by a priest-king, Illi, who also attacked Lagash.

His son and successor Entemena restored the prestige of Lagash. Illi of Umma was subdued, with the help of his ally Lugal-kinishe-dudu or Lugal-ure of Uruk, successor to Enshakushana and also on the king-list. Lugal-kinishe-dudu seems to have been the prominent figure at the time, since he also claimed to rule Kish and Ur. A silver vase dedicated by Entemena to his god is now in the Louvre. A frieze of lions devouring ibexes and deer, incised with great artistic skill, runs round the neck, while the Anzû crest of Lagash adorns the globular part. The vase is a proof of the high degree of excellence to which the goldsmith's art had already attained. A vase of calcite, also dedicated by Entemena, has been found at Nippur. After Entemena, a series of weak, corrupt priest-kings is attested for Lagash. The last of these, Urukagina, was known for his judicial, social, and economic reforms, and his may well be the first legal code known to have existed.

Border conflict with Umma (c. 2500–2300 BC)

In c. 2450 BC, Lagash and the neighbouring city of Umma fell out with each other after a border dispute. As described in Stele of the Vultures the current king of Lagash, Eannatum, inspired by the patron god of his city, Ningirsu, set out with his army to defeat the nearby city. Initial details of the battle are unclear, but the Stele is able to portray a few vague details about the event. According to the Stele's engravings, when the two sides met each other in the field, Eannatum dismounted from his chariot and proceeded to lead his men on foot. After lowering their spears, the Lagash army advanced upon the army from Umma in a dense phalanx. After a brief clash, Eannatum and his army had gained victory over the army of Umma. Despite having been struck in the eye by an arrow, the king of Lagash lived on to enjoy his army's victory. This battle is one of the earliest organised battles known to scholars and historians.

Destruction of Lagash by the Akkadian Empire (circa 2300 BC)

In his conquest of Sumer circa 2300 BC, Sargon of Akkad, after conquering and destroying Uruk, then conquered Ur and E-Ninmar and "laid waste" the territory from Lagash to the sea, and from there went on to conquer and destroy Umma, and he collected tribute from Mari and Elam. He triumphed over 34 cities in total.

Sargon's son and successor Rimush faced widespread revolts, and had to reconquer the cities of Ur, Umma, Adab, Lagash, Der, and Kazallu from rebellious ensis.

Rimush introduced mass slaughter and large scale destruction of the Sumerian city-states, and maintained meticulous records of his destructions. Most of the major Sumerian cities were destroyed, and Sumerian human losses were enormous: for the cities of Ur and Lagash, he records 8,049 killed, 5,460 "captured and enslaved" and 5,985 "expelled and annihilated".

Stele of the victory of Rimush over Lagash
A Victory Stele in several fragments (three in total, Louvre Museum AO 2678) has been attributed to Rimush on stylistic and epigraphical grounds. One of the fragments mentions Akkad and Lagash. It is thought that the stele represents the defeat of Lagash by the troops of Akkad. The stele was excavated in ancient Girsu, one of the main cities of the territory of Lagash.

Second dynasty of Lagash (c. 2230–2110 BC)

This period lasted c. 2230–2110 BC (Middle chronology). These rulers achieved a Sumerian revival, following the rise and fall of the Semitic Akkadian Empire, and the conquests of the Gutian dynasty. The Second dynasty of Lagash rose at the time the Gutians were ruling in central Mesopotamia. The rulers of Lagash, only taking the title of Ensi, or Governors, achieved and maintained a high level of independence from the Gutians in the southernmost areas of Mesoptamia. Under Gudea, Lagash had a golden age, and seemed to enjoy a high level of independence from the Gutians.

Archaeology

Lagash is one of the largest archaeological sites in the region, measuring roughly 3.5 kilometers north to south and 1.5 kilometers east to west though is relatively low being only 6 meters above the plain level at maximum. A drone survey determined that Lagash developed on four marsh islands some of which were gated. The site is divided by the bed of a canal/river, which runs diagonally through the mound. The site was first excavated, for six weeks, by Robert Koldewey in 1887. It was inspected during a survey of the area by Thorkild Jacobsen and Fuad Safar in 1953, finding the first evidence of its identification as Lagash. The major polity in the region of al-Hiba and Tello had formerly been identified as ŠIR.BUR.LA (Shirpurla).

Tell Al-Hiba was again explored in five seasons of excavation between 1968 and 1976 by a team from the Metropolitan Museum of Art and the Institute of Fine Arts of New York University. The team was led by Vaughn E. Crawford, and included Donald P. Hansen and Robert D. Biggs. Twelve archaeological layers were found with the bottom 9 being Early Dynastic and the lowest under the water table. The primary focus was the excavation of the temple Ibgal of Inanna and the temple Bagara of Ningirsu, as well as an associated administrative area. The team returned 12 years later, in 1990, for a sixth and final season of excavation led by D. P. Hansen. The work primarily involved areas adjacent to an, as yet, unexcavated temple Ibgal of the goddess Inanna in the southwest edge of the city. The Bagara temple of Ningirsu was also worked on. Both were built by Early Dynastic III king Eannatum. Temples to the goddesses Gatumdag, Nanshe, and Bau are known to have existed but have not yet been found. A canal linked linked the E-ninnu temple of Ningirsu at Girsu, the E-sirara temple of Nanshe at Nigin, and the Bagara temple at Lagash, the three cities being part of one large state.  In 1984 a surface survey found that most finds were from the Early Dynastic III period. Small amounts of Uruk, Jemdet Nasr, Isin-Larsa, Old Babylonian and Kassite shards were found in isolated areas.

In March–April 2019, field work resumed as the Lagash Archaeological Project under the directorship of Dr. Holly Pittman of the University of Pennsylvania's Penn Museum in collaboration with the University of Cambridge and Sara Pizzimenti of the University of Pisa. A second season ran from October to November in 2021. A third season ran from March 6 to April 10, 2022. The work primarily involved the Early Dynastic Period Area G and Area H locations along with Geophysical Surveying and Geoarchaeology. The focus was on an industrial area and associated streets, residences, and kilns. Aerial mapping of Lagash, both using UAV drone mapping and satellite imagery was performed. In the fall of 2022 a 4th season of excavation resumed. Among the finds were a public eatery with ovens, a refrigeration system, benches, and large numbers of bowls and beakers.

Area A (Ibgal of Inanna)

Site history 

Though commonly known as Area A or the Ibgal of Inanna, this temple complex was actually named Eanna during the Ur periods, while Inanna’s sanctuary within Eanna was known as Ibgal.

Level I architecture 

Level I of Area A was occupied from Early Dynastic Ur (ED I) to Ur III. It was used for both daily worship activities and festive celebrations, particularly for the queen of Lagash during the Barley and Malt-eating festivals of Nanše.

Referring to Hansen’s map in his preliminary report, Level I consists of an oval wall on the Northeast end, surrounding an extensive courtyard. The fragments, together with Hansen’s comparison to another Sumerian temple at Khafajah, show that the wall should originally be approximately 130m long.

For the temple-building, it is connected to the courtyard with steps. Twenty-five rooms have been excavated inside the building, in which the western ones would open up to the outside of the temple with corridors and form a tripartite entrance. Both the temple-building and the oval wall were built with plano-convex mud bricks, which was a very common material during the Ur periods. Additionally, foundations are found under the temple-building. They are composed of rectangular areas of various sizes, some as solid mud bricks and some as cavities of broken pieces of alluvial mud and layers of sand, then capped again with mud bricks.

Level II and Level III architecture 

Two more levels are present beneath Level I. Interestingly, all of them are similar to each other in terms of layout and construction materials. During the process of building on top of each other, workers at that time would choose to destroy some portions while keeping some others, leading to much open speculation as to the rationales behind.

Area B (3HB Building and 4HB Building at Bagara of Ningirsu)

The 3HB Building

Basic Information 
Three building levels were discovered and 3HB III is the earliest and most well-preserved level. 3HB II and 3HB I shared the same layout with 3HB III.

All three levels have a central niched-and-buttressed building which is surrounded by a low enclosure wall with unknown height.

Possible Functions 
Hansen believes that the 3HB Building was a “kitchen temple” that aimed at meeting some of the god’s demands. However, Ashby argues that the building was a shrine in the Bagara complex as it shared more similarities with other temples than kitchens in terms of layout, features and contents.

The 4HB Building

Basic Information 

The excavators discovered five building levels. The layout of 4HB V cannot be obtained due to limited exploration. 4HB IV-4HB I shared the same layout. 4HB IVB was the first level that was exposed completely.

Possible Functions 
Hansen suggests that the 4HB Building is a brewery as ovens and storage vats and a tablet mentioning “the brewery” and “a brewer” were found. Ashby proposes another possibility that 4HB building is a kitchen as it shared lots of similarities with temple kitchens at Ur and Nippur.

Area C 
Located 360 meters southeast of Area B. It contains a large Early Dynastic administrative area with two building levels (1A and 1B). In level 1B were found sealing and tablets of Eanatum, Enanatum I, and Enmetena.

Area G

Site History 

Area G is located at the midway of Area B in the North and Area A in the South. First excavated by Dr Donald P. Hansen in season 3H, Area G consists of a building complex and a curving wall which are separated by around 30-40m.

Western Building Complex 

5 building levels are found in the area. There is little information about Levels I and IIA as they were poorly preserved without sealed floor deposits. In Levels IIB, III and IV, changes can be found in the building complex with reconstructions. In Level III, benches are built near the eastern and northern courtyards. Sealings made in the “piedmont” style which are found in the rooms share a resemblance with the Seal Impression Strata of Ur and sealings from Inanna Temple at Nippur, indicating the administrative nature of the buildings. Apart from institutional objects, fireplaces, bins and pottery were found in the rooms as well.

Curving Wall (Eastern Zone) 
A 2-m wide wall that runs from the south to the north is found on the eastern part of Area G. The features of the curving wall and the rooms found near it are determined to be different from other oval temples built in the Early Dynastic in other major states. Intrusive vertical drains are found at the base of the plano-convex foundation. Archaeologists excavated further deeper to the water level during season 4H and found extensive Early Dynastic I deposits.

See also

List of cities of the ancient Near East
The Sumerian Game

References

Sources

Robert D. Biggs, "Inscriptions from al-Hiba-Lagash : the first and second seasons", Bibliotheca Mesopotamica. 3, Undena Publications, 1976, 
R. D. Biggs, "Pre-Sargonic Riddles from Lagash", Journal of Near Eastern Studies, vol. 32, no. 1/2, pp. 26–33, 1973
Vaughn E. Crawford, "Lagash", Iraq, vol. 36, no. 1/2, pp. 29–35, 1974
Foxvog D.A., "Aspects of Name-Giving in Presargonic Lagash", in W. Heimpel – G. Frantz- Szabó (eds.), Strings and Threads: A Celebration of the Work of Anne Draffkorn Kilmer, Winona Lake, 59-97, 2011
Hansen, D. P., "Lagaš. B. Archäologisch", Reallexikon der Assyriologie und Vorderasiatischen Archäologie 6: 422–30, 1980–1983
Donald P. Hansen, "Royal building activity at Sumerian Lagash in the Early Dynastic Period", Biblical Archaeologist, vol. 55, pp. 206–11, 1992
Hritz, C., "The Umma-Lagash Border Conflict: A View from Above" in Altaweel, M. and Hritz, C. (eds.), From Sherds to Landscapes: Studies on the Ancient Near East in Honor of McGuire Gibson. Chicago: The Oriental Institute of the University of Chicago, pp. 109–32, 2021
Kenoyer, J. M., "Shell artifacts from Lagash, al-Hiba", Sumer 46 (1/2), pp. 64–67, 1989-1990
Maeda T., "Work Concerning Irrigation Canals in Pre-Sargonic Lagash", Acta Sumerologica Japaniensia 6, 33-53, 1984
Maekawa K., "The Development of the é-mí in Lagash during Early Dynastic III", Mesopotamia 8-9, 77-144, 1973-1974
Mudar, K., "Early Dynastic III animal utilization in Lagash: a report on the fauna of Tell al-Hiba", Journal of Near Eastern Studies 41 (1), pp. 23-34, 1982
Prentice, R., "The exchange of goods and services in pre-Sargonic Lagash", Münster: Ugarit-Verlag, 2010
Rey, Sébastien, and Fatma Husain, "Tello/Girsu: New Research on the Sacred City of the State of Lagash", in  Ancient Lagash Current Research and Future Trajectories - Proceedings of the Workshop held at the 10th ICAANE in Vienna, April 2016, pp. 183-194, 2022
Renette, Steve, "Some Observations on Regional Ceramic Traditions at al-Hiba/Lagash", in  Ancient Lagash Current Research and Future Trajectories - Proceedings of the Workshop held at the 10th ICAANE in Vienna, April 2016,  pp. 145-160, 2022
Renette, Steve, "PAINTED POTTERY FROM AL-HIBA: GODIN TEPE III CHRONOLOGY AND INTERACTIONS BETWEEN ANCIENT LAGASH AND ELAM", Iran, vol. 53, pp. 49–63, 2015
Garcia-Ventura, Agnès, and Fumi Karahashi. "Overseers of textile workers in presargonic Lagash.", Overseers of Textile Workers in Presargonic Lagash (2016): KASKAL, 1-19.

External links
Drone photos reveal an early Mesopotamian city made of marsh islands - Science News - October 13, 2022
University of Pennsylvania Lagash Current and Legacy excavations page
Excavations in the Swamps of Sumer - Vaughn E. Crawford - Expedition Magazine Volume 14 Issue 2 1972
University of Cambridge Lagash project
Lagash excavation site photographs at the Oriental Institute
Lagash Digital Tablets at CDLI
The Al-Hiba Publication Project
The Al-Hiba Publication Project - digitization
5,000-Year-Old Tavern With Food Still Inside Discovered in Iraq

Populated places established in the 3rd millennium BC
1887 archaeological discoveries
Sumerian cities
Archaeological sites in Iraq
Dhi Qar Governorate
Former populated places in Iraq
Former kingdoms
City-states